Tundav is a village in the Mehsana district in the north of Gujarat, India. , it had a population of 4,280. Tundav is in Unjha tehsil of the Mehsana district, situated between cities Unjha, Patan and Sidhpur. Tundav is a gram panchayat.

Geography

Tundav is 7 km away from Unjha and 32 km away from Mehsana and 98 km away from Ahmedabad (all values approximate). Its average elevation is 110 metres (364 feet).

Castes

The local castes are Patel, Parmar (Vankar), Prajapati, Brahman, Nayi, Daraji, Thakor, Panchal, Suthar, and Rabari.

Transport
Transport is available via auto-rickshaws, government buses, eco, and also jeeps for connecting Unjha to Tundav. GSRTC bus serves the village. Its distance from Unjha is 7 km.

Education 
From Kindergarten and 1-12 standard. There is two government schools primary and secondary school and there is also a private school available.

Primary school 
In Tundav, one primary school is located in the middle of the village. Any children from the village are enrolled in this school and can learn up to the seventh standard. It is a government school.

Secondary school 
In secondary school, there are two sections. The first section is for the study of kindergarten, for KG1 and KG2 students. The second section is used for the study of the 8th to 12th standard.

Medical facility 
There is one house available for primary medical care. It is located for primary medical service in the village, but in an emergency or critical situation, patients must go to Unjha, Mehsana, or Ahmedabad for better medical treatment. There are several private doctors in the village for primary medical services.

Economy
Productive sectors are varied and shown below.

Agriculture
Most people depend on farming and also earn money from selling farm products at the market yard of Unjha.

Milk and product
People have many buffalo, cattle, sheep, and camel. They sell milk in the Sahakari limited. Milk and its products are made and sold regularly.

Employment

Many residents work in Unjha and Mehsana.

Population

Nearby Villages

 Maherwada
 Lihoda
 Bhunav
 Dasaj
 Maktupur
 Amudh
 Sunak
 Dabhi
 Shihi
 Bhankhar
 Ranchhodpura

References

Villages in Mehsana district